Svein Ørnulf Ellingsen (13 July 1929 – 5 April 2020) was a Norwegian visual artist and hymnist.

Biography
Ellingsen was born in Kongsberg to Fritz Frølich Ellingsen and Karoline Enge. His books include the poetry collections Det skjulte nærvær and Noen må våke, both from 1978, the children's book Regler, rim og revestreker from 1986, and the poetry collections Vårt øye ser mot Betlehem (1987) and Det finnes en dyrebar rose (1989). The hymnal Norsk salmebok 2013 has included 58 of his hymns, including fifteen translations. He received the Fritt Ord Honorary Award in 1992, and was decorated Knight, First Class of the Order of St. Olav in 1995.

He died on 5 April 2020.

References

External links
 
  (record label)

1929 births
2020 deaths
People from Kongsberg
20th-century Norwegian male artists
21st-century Norwegian male artists
Norwegian hymnwriters
Norwegian government scholars